The canton of Fougères-1 is an administrative division of the Ille-et-Vilaine department, in northwestern France. It was created at the French canton reorganisation which came into effect in March 2015. Its seat is in Fougères.

It consists of the following communes: 
 
Billé
La Chapelle-Saint-Aubert
Combourtillé
Fougères (partly)
Gosné
Javené
Lécousse
Livré-sur-Changeon
Mézières-sur-Couesnon
Parcé
Rives-du-Couesnon
Romagné
Saint-Aubin-du-Cormier 
Saint-Christophe-de-Valains
Saint-Ouen-des-Alleux
Saint-Sauveur-des-Landes

References

Cantons of Ille-et-Vilaine